Andaman and Nicobar Islands Institute of Medical Sciences, Port Blair is a medical school in Port Blair, India. Andaman & Nicobar Islands Institute of Medical Sciences (ANIIMS) is a 100% Govt. funded College established by Andaman & Nicobar Medical Education and Research Society (ANIMERS) under Andaman & Nicobar Administration. The medical school is established under the Centrally Sponsored Scheme for 'Establishment of new (58 colleges) Medical Colleges attached with existing district/referral hospitals'.

The College was set up in a record time of less than an year

Location
It is situated at Atlanta Point, next to the National Memorial Cellular Jail Complex, Port Blair, South Andaman District, Andaman and Nicobar Islands. The permanent location of the college, where new infrastructure is being constructed is Corbyns Cove, South Point, Port Blair, South Andaman District.

Teaching Hospital
GB Pant Hospital also serves as a referral hospital for the entire A & N Islands. It has almost all general specialties. The new OPD Block houses outpatient department, reception / central registration, diagnostic laboratories, blood bank and auditorium / lecture Hall. The services provided at the Hospital is 100% free regardless of income, insurance status, race, sex and country of origin.

Departments
Anaesthesiology
Anatomy
Biochemistry
Community Medicine
Dentistry
Dermatology
ENT
Forensic Medicine
Medicine
Microbiology
Obstetrics & Gynaecology
Ophthalmology
Orthopaedics
Paediatrics
Pathology
Pharmacology
Physiology
Psychiatry
Radiology
Surgery
TB & Chest

Admission
The college admits 100 students for the graduate program of Bachelor of Medicine and Bachelor of Surgery (MBBS) students annually. Candidates are selected on the basis of their performance in the National Eligibility and Entrance Test (NEET). 
75% of available undergraduate positions are reserved for the students of Andaman & Nicobar Islands, 10% are reserved for NRI's and 15% are reserved for All India Quota.

References

Medical colleges in the Andaman and Nicobar Islands
Universities and colleges in the Andaman and Nicobar Islands
Colleges affiliated to Pondicherry University
Education in the Andaman and Nicobar Islands
2015 establishments in the Andaman and Nicobar Islands
Port Blair